Thuraiyur  is a village in the Arimalamrevenue block of Pudukkottai district, Tamil Nadu, India.

Demographics 

 census, Thuraiyur had a total population of 1111 with 526 males and 585 females. Out of the total population 554 people were literate.

References

Villages in Pudukkottai district